Book store shoplifting is a problem for book sellers and has sometimes led stores to keep certain volumes behind store counters.

Shoplifters at book stores may be thieves who want the book, or thieves who want to make money by selling the book.  Those with systematic resale in mind usually target high-priced books and books that are easily resold, such as academic textbooks.  Overall, most books are stolen by people who steal books occasionally, but professionals may steal more books in a single visit.  Disaffected young white males  may be over-represented among thieves who steal for reasons other than the book's immediate resale value.

In addition to shoplifting, book stores suffer from pilfering by shipping personnel and from burglary (theft that happens while the store is closed). Book stores also are victimized by thefts of non-book merchandise and other items.

Effects on business
Owners of small, independent book stores find shoplifting particularly bothersome. According to Paul Constant, a Seattle book-store employee, "I know a few booksellers who have literally been driven a little bit crazy at the thought of their inventory evaporating out the door, and with good reason: An overabundance of shoplifters can put bookstores out of business. One local bookstore owner can famously talk about shoplifters with total strangers for hours, with the detail and passion that some people reserve for sexual conquests."

"Shoplifting is a particular problem," said Patricia Van Osdol, owner of Wellington Books in Portland, Oregon. "It can be disastrous in a small store like this."

Some bookstores report multiple attempted thefts each week.

Books frequently stolen
Certain books, or books by certain authors, are much more likely to be stolen than others, although there are no centralized statistics on the subject.  Generally speaking, whatever is popular or trendy is at risk for being stolen.  The size of the book also matters, because a small book is easier to conceal than a large one.

In 2017, Canadian book thieves were targeting relatively high-brow works, such as those by Haruki Murakami.

Ron Rosenbaum, an author and New York Observer columnist, wrote in 1999 that Barnes & Noble had a list of these authors whose books are the most frequently stolen from that book-store chain (or perhaps the Union Square store in the chain, where his source, "a helpful clerk", worked): Martin Amis, Paul Auster, Georges Bataille, William S. Burroughs, Italo Calvino, Raymond Chandler, Michel Foucault, Dashiell Hammett, Jack Kerouac, Jeanette Winterson, but none more frequently than books by Charles Bukowski.

In the United Kingdom, The Virgin Suicides by Jeffrey Eugenides was the most-shoplifted book in 2007.

St. Mark's Bookshop (which closed in 2016) in the East Village of Manhattan, like Barnes & Noble, used to move frequently-stolen titles behind the counter. At that bookstore, as of late 2009, the books behind the counter included works by Amis, Bukowski, Burroughs, Raymond Carver, Don DeLillo and Jack Kerouac. Sometimes the staff moves books back to the shelves with the idea that a book's popularity with thieves may have lessened over time. "Amis went out and came right back," a store manager told a writer for The New York Times.

In 2008, Constant gave this list, which he called "pretty much the authoritative top five, the New York Times best-seller list of stolen books": Bukowski, Jim Thompson, Philip K. Dick, and Burroughs, along with "any graphic novel". Constant wrote that other popular targets are books by Hunter S. Thompson and the Beats, Chuck Palahniuk, Haruki Murakami, and Mark Z. Danielewski, and the most-stolen books tend to be a steady group with little variation over time. As of late 2009, Danielewski's House of Leaves was the most frequently stolen book from Vroman's Bookstore in Pasadena, California, according to a store manager there.

In addition to graphic novels, comic books may be targeted by thieves.

In bookstores at universities, students may steal textbooks, especially at the start of the school year.

In comparison with books stolen from public libraries

Public libraries have a much different set of frequently stolen books. In the United States, how-to books are more often the targets of thieves, as are books about witchcraft, the occult, UFOs or astrology, according to Larra Clark, a spokeswoman for the American Library Association, who asked members which books were most often stolen. Of the 70 libraries across the United States who responded to her query in 2001, none mentioned books by Charles Bukowski. An official from a prison library responded that dictionaries and poetry were the most frequently stolen types of books at that institution.

The social and emotional difference between stealing from a business and stealing from a public library can feel significant.  Thefts from a small business reduces the owners' income, but thefts from a library can affect many people throughout society.

Book thieves 
According to Rosenbaum, "[I]f you look at who's actually doing the shoplifting, they're not really down-and-out, lower-depths types but like to pose as being down and out, and shoplifting is part of the aura." Constant wrote, "[F]iction that young white men read, and self-satisfied young white men, the kind who love to stick it to the man, are the majority of book shoplifters."

Some book thieves are drug addicts.  Others, apparently well-off people, seem to steal books for the thrill of it.

Jon Hamm said that he repeatedly stole books from a local bookstore when he was 14 years old.

Theft for profit
According to Tom Cushman, a New York book-store manager interviewed in 2005, factors influencing book thefts included high resale value and whether or not the book was displayed in an area difficult for the store clerks to watch. When Harry Potter books were new and popular items in book stores, they were among the top targets of thieves, he said.

Brian Zimmerman, associate general manager at the San Francisco State University book store, said thieves there were much more likely to be students, but professional thieves took more books and targeted volumes with higher prices. Thieves have been known to take whole stacks of books at once. According to a 1991 article in The Philadelphia Inquirer, studies showed that the "casual thief", defined as "not a professional but more than a one-timer", accounted for 70 to 75 percent of shoplifting.  

In 1992, the Los Angeles Times reported that thieves were so brazen in New York City that just outside St. Mark's Bookshop, "sidewalk peddlers openly ply books – many of them still bearing St. Mark's telltale stamp – at half off the prices inside the store."

In the early 1990s, book store owners in New York and California accused second-hand book stores of organizing theft rings to shoplift titles for resale. Drama Book Shop in Manhattan lost 533 books with a total sales price of $10,873 from January 1 to May 8, 1991. One thief told store officials that a ring organized by a second-hand store had been assigned to steal books from the Drama Book Shop, according to Rozanne Seelan, co-owner of the victimized store.  An individual serial thief may steal thousands of dollars' worth of books over multiple visits to a store.  A team of thieves has been known to steal 100 books in a single day.  In previous decades, organized groups of thieves might try to steal books that would be sold through their own or a specific bookstore.  With the democratization of online selling platforms, more stolen books may be sold online instead.

Countermeasures
Book stores at San Francisco State University and City College of San Francisco train their employees who are examining books being returned or sold to the stores to look for price tag stickers, books that don't seem to have been used, and anyone offering to sell multiple copies of a single title. 

As with any retail store, some anti-theft measures, such as security cameras and greeting patrons, can reduce theft and help sellers identify thieves. When store employees approach customers to ask whether they need help, that action discourages theft.  Stores may also move frequently stolen items to the back of the store or to areas that are easier for staff to watch or areas that have more cameras.

In addition to reporting crimes to the police, in some places, it is possible to ban suspected thieves from entering the stores or to recover certain expenses through non-criminal legal action.

Reactions of authors
Jeffrey Eugenides and Paul Auster both laughed when journalists asked them about being some of the authors whose books are most shoplifted. "It's one of those things authors argue about" among themselves, Eugenides said, adding that he and Auster had discussed their status as authors of frequently stolen books.

Abbie Hoffman wrote Steal This Book in 1970 and published in 1971. While largely about rebelling against authority, it includes a section on shoplifting.

Non-book thefts
Thieves steal more than books from bookstores.  At Vroman's Bookstore in Pasadena, California, someone attempted to steal a security camera. At the Boulder Bookshop in Boulder, Colorado, prints hung in the bathroom, and plants, have been stolen.

See also
 Shoplifting
 Bookstores
 Book theft from libraries

References

Bookselling
Theft